Greatest Hits: Back to the Start is the second greatest hits album by Megadeth. It was released on June 28, 2005, via Capitol Records. The title "Back to the Start" is a reference to lyrics in "Rust in Peace... Polaris" from Megadeth's 1990 album Rust in Peace: "The day of final conflict/All pay the price/The third World War rapes peace/Takes life back to the start." The cover art is an edited version of the Castle Romeo H-bomb test.

Background and release
The selection of tracks for the album was largely determined by fans, who voted on songs in polls on the band's website. However, the inclusion of "Kill the King," a track originally released on Capitol Punishment: The Megadeth Years, was insisted upon by Mustaine. To help promote the release, a new video was made for "Kill the King."

Commercial performance
Greatest Hits: Back to the Start reached No. 65 on the U.S. Billboard 200, selling 17,441 copies according to Nielsen SoundScan. By December 16, 2005, the album had sold about 133,000 copies in the U.S. The album was also certified gold in Canada in July 2011. On July 23, 2011 in Toronto, Canada, the band was presented with gold plaques by EMI in recognition of the achievement.

Reception

Jason Birchmeier of AllMusic critiqued the album for being more of a sampler and having a more "balanced" approach to the band's Capitol Records material, rather than focusing on Megadeth's first few records.

Track listing

Limited edition DVD
 "Kill the King" music video
 "Live at the Fillmore Auditorium December 27, 1999"
 "Prince of Darkness"
 "Holy Wars... The Punishment Due"
 "In My Darkest Hour"
 "Hangar 18"
 "Sweating Bullets"
 "Symphony of Destruction"
 "Peace Sells"
 Arsenal of Megadeth trailer

Personnel
Dave Mustaine – guitars, lead vocals on all tracks
Marty Friedman – guitars on tracks 1, 4–7, 9, 11, 13, and 15–17
Chris Poland – guitars on tracks 3, 10 and 12
Al Pitrelli – guitars on tracks 8 and 14
Jeff Young – guitars on "In My Darkest Hour"
David Ellefson – bass on all tracks
Nick Menza – drums on tracks 1, 4–7, 9, 11, 13, and 15–16
Gar Samuelson – drums on tracks 3, 10 and 12
Jimmy DeGrasso – drums on tracks 8, 14, and 17
Chuck Behler – drums on "In My Darkest Hour"

Charts

Certifications

References

2005 greatest hits albums
Megadeth compilation albums
2005 live albums
Live video albums
2005 video albums
Heavy metal compilation albums